Tomopisthes is a genus of South American anyphaenid sac spiders first described by Eugène Simon in 1884.

Species
 it contains five species:
Tomopisthes horrendus (Nicolet, 1849) – Chile, Argentina
Tomopisthes puconensis (Ramírez, 2003) – Chile, Argentina
Tomopisthes pusillus (Nicolet, 1849) – Chile, Argentina
Tomopisthes tullgreni Simon, 1905 – Argentina
Tomopisthes varius Simon, 1884 – Chile, Argentina

References

Anyphaenidae
Araneomorphae genera
Spiders of South America
Taxa named by Eugène Simon